In human sexuality, top, bottom, and versatile are roles during sexual activity, especially between two men. A top is usually a person who penetrates, a bottom is usually one who receives penetration, and someone who is versatile engages in either or both roles. These terms may be elements of self-identity that indicate an individual's usual preference and habits, but might also describe broader sexual identities and social roles.

Top is known formally as insertive sex role, and bottom is known formally as receptive sex role.

The terms top and bottom do not refer to the literal physical position during sex.

For men who have sex with men and do not engage in anal sex, the term "side" has been proposed and has seen commercial use. Side men do not engage in anal sex but rather enjoy outercourse.

Top

A top is usually a person who engages in the penetrative role during sexual activity; for men who have sex with men (MSMs), this often involves penetration using the penis during anal or oral sex. Top is also used as a verb meaning "to penetrate another". Top may also describe a broader personal identity involving dominance in a romantic or sexual relationship; however, this stipulation is not a requisite element of being a top.

Several related terms exist. A  is one noted for their great skill or aggressiveness in topping. A  is "one who tops under the direction of an eager bottom". A  is one who prefers to top but who bottoms occasionally.

Trevor Hart of the Centers for Disease Control and Prevention (CDC) found that self-identified tops were more likely to act as the penetrative partner in other sexual activities (besides anal intercourse), including oral sex and sex toy play.

Bottom
A bottom is usually the receptive partner during sexual penetration. This frequently refers to MSM who are penetrated via the anus during anal sex. Bottom is also used as a verb meaning "to be penetrated by another, whether anally or orally". Bottom may also describe a wider social context of submission within a romantic or sexual relationship, though this element does not apply to all people who prefer to bottom.

In gay male sexuality, a total bottom is someone who assumes an exclusively receptive role during anal or oral intercourse. A  is someone who aggressively enjoys being the receptive partner.  A  is one who prefers to bottom but who tops occasionally. The terms  or  may be preferred by some. An oral bottom is the exclusively receptive partner in oral sex, providing the penetrative partner, or oral top, with unreciprocated fellatio or irrumatio.

Versatile

Versatile, or vers, refers to a person who enjoys both topping and bottoming and may alternate between the two in sexual situations. Flip-flop or flip fuck commonly describes switching from top to bottom during one sexual encounter between two men. Each participant penetrates the other and is penetrated in his turn.

Versatility is a concept of lifestyle.  Versatility, though, is not limited to the simple acts of anal, oral, or vaginal penetration, but also includes the splitting of duties and responsibilities in the relationship.

According to some, living a versatile lifestyle implies a certain openness to new things and an opposition to labels, stereotypes and generalizations. Therefore, this concept differs from heterosexual relationships where sexual compatibility does not begin with guessing who will end up as top or bottom.
In self descriptions of men seeking sex with other men, they may refer to themselves as a versatile tops or versatile bottoms in addition to using other terms.

A 2009 Austrian study on gay pornography has shown that at least 82.4% of all men performing in the male porn industry are versatile at some point during their career. In this study, the performances of 5,556 actors were considered. 10.8% performed only in the top role, 6.8% only as bottoms. The study also found that the actor with the larger penis was more likely to act as the top.

Side

The term side was coined in 2013 in an article by psychotherapist and sexologist Joe Kort for gay men who are not interested in anal sex. In the article, Kort offered this definition: "Sides prefer to kiss, hug and engage in oral sex, rimming, mutual masturbation and rubbing up and down on each other, to name just a few of the sexual activities they enjoy. These men enjoy practically every sexual practice aside from anal penetration of any kind."

The term has gained increasingly broad acceptance since then. In May 2022, the gay dating app Grindr added Side as a position option and other apps have subsequently followed suit.

Prevalence

A tally of 55,464 profiles on gay.com from the United States showed that 26.46% preferred top, while 31.92% preferred bottom, and the largest group (41.62%) preferred versatile. The preferences seemed to vary by state, however. In Wyoming, for example, 16% preferred top, 44% preferred bottom, and 40% preferred versatile. In West Virginia, tops outnumbered bottoms by a slim margin (32% top, 29% bottom, and 39% versatile). In Oregon, "versatile" profiles made up nearly half (48.42%).

A study of the most recent sexual encounter among men who have sex with men found only 37.2% of participants had engaged in anal sex, while 72.7% had participated in oral sex and 68.4% in partnered masturbation.

Other

General

In the hanky code, a person flagging the top, or active, role would wear the hanky in the left pocket, and the bottom, or passive, role on the right. Acts which were not divisible into distinct roles, however, such as "69" or "anything", followed a pattern in which one flagged interest by wearing the hanky on the left and absence of interest by wearing it on the right, and preferences that did not relate to sexual mechanics, such as uniform fetishism or prostitution, followed a pattern in which the seeker flagged on the right and the object of desire flagged on the left.

The cowboy position is anal sex in which the bottom straddles the top. The position is often cited as being advantageous for bottoms who are new to anal sex, as it allows the receiving partner to lower himself on to the other's penis at his own pace.

Alternative terminology
Other terms for top and bottom include active and passive, and pitcher and catcher. The intended meanings of active vs. passive in reference to oral sex can be unclear, however. Switch is sometimes used for versatile.

Role vs. position among sexualities 
The terms top, bottom and versatile do not necessarily refer literally to physical position during sex. For example, if the inserting partner lies on his back and the receptive partner straddles him, the inserting partner is still considered the top, and the receptive partner the bottom, despite their reverse physical arrangement.

See also

 Lordosis behavior
 Seme and uke: related terms in Japanese manga and anime publications and fandom
 Sex position
 Top, bottom, and switch: terms used in BDSM erotic practices and roleplaying

References
Notes

Bibliography

 Dossie Easton, Janet W. Hardy. The New Topping Book. Greenery Press, 2003. .
 Person, Ethel S. / Terestman, Nettie / Myers, Wayne A. / Goldberg, Eugene L. / Salvadori, Carol: Gender differences in sexual behaviors and fantasies in a college population, 1989, erschienen in: Journal of Sex and Marital Therapy, Bd. 15, Nr. 3, 1989, P. 187–198
 Janus, Samuel S. / Janus, Cynthia L., 1993 The Janus Report on Sexual Behavior, Wiley, New York
 Charles Moser, in Journal of Social Work and Human Sexuality 1988, (7;1, P.43–56)

Anal eroticism
Gender roles in the LGBT community
LGBT slang
Male homosexuality
Sexual roles
Sexology